St. Joseph's College, Nainital is a day boarding and residential school in Nainital, Kumaon, India, providing private school education.

Overview
St Joseph's college was established in 1888. The site was previously the location of a seminary, run by the Italian Capuchin Fathers. The school is still referred to as "SEM" (for Seminary). In 1892 four Christian Brothers took formal charge of St Joseph's College, and thus began the involvement of the Christian Brothers in the running of the school.

The school is one of 20 educational institutions in India conducted by the Congregation of Christian Brothers, a pontifical institute, founded in Ireland in 1802 by Edmund Ignatius Rice, a wealthy Catholic layman, who was beatified in 1996.

Student life
The pupils are boys are aged 6 to 18. The roll numbers about 1100, with 360 boarders. New admissions are taken only in classes one and eleven. Boarders are admitted from class 3 onwards. The school is affiliated to the Council for the Indian School Certificate Examinations and prepares students for the ICSE examinations. It has a plus-two section for the ISC examination.
 
The school has seven playing fields, a gymnasium, lawn tennis, two squash courts, basketball court, billiard tables, and a swimming pool. The school takes part in inter-college events. The college has a distinguished football team in tournaments of Nainital and Edmund Rice schools. 

The school hosts inter-school events such as the Edmund Rice Meet and the Nirip Deep Memorial Soccer Tournament. Events such as quizzes, debates, declamations and elocution contests are held.

Notable alumni

Politics 

 K. C. Pant – Union minister with Cabinet rank and Vice Chairman of the Planning Commission
 Rajendra Singh – head of Rashtriya Swayamsevak Sangh
 K. C. Singh Baba – Member of Parliament, Nainital and sportsman
 Kirti Vardhan Singh – Member of Parliament
 Sajeeb Wazed – son of Sheikh Hasina
Sumit Hridayesh , MLA , Haldwani , Uttrakhand

Armed forces 
Zameer Uddin Shah
Rajesh Singh Adhikari
Rustom K. S. Ghandhi – governor of Himachal Pradesh

Business, commerce and industry 
 Peter de Noronha – philanthropist and civil servant
Neeraj Roy – entrepreneur

Education, fine arts and media 

Sorab K. Ghandhi – scientist
Naseeruddin Shah – film actor
Neelesh Misra – songwriter, journalist and author
Paritosh Painter – theatre actor, director and film, TV writer
Suhel Seth – actor
Manoj Joshi – journalist
Amit Abraham – psychologist

Sports 
Richard James Allen – field hockey player
Ronald Riley – field hockey player
Trevor Vanderputt – field hockey player

Media
The school's buildings have featured in Indian films. The best known of these are Masoom (winner of 4 Filmfare Awards) and Koi... Mil Gaya (winner of 5 Filmfare Awards). The school buildings have also featured in various TV series such as Breathe into the shadows.

See also 
List of Christian Brothers schools

References 

1888 establishments in British India
Boarding schools in Uttarakhand
British colonial architecture in India
Boys' schools in India
Catholic boarding schools in India
Catholic secondary schools in India
Christian schools in Uttarakhand
Congregation of Christian Brothers schools in India
Education in Nainital
Educational institutions established in 1888
High schools and secondary schools in Uttarakhand
Primary schools in India
Schools in Colonial India